Bavly (Bawlı) is a town in the Tatarstan, Russia, located on the Bavly River (Ik's tributary),  southeast of Kazan. Population:

History
It was founded in 1755, granted urban-type settlement status in 1950, and that of a town in 1998.

Administrative and municipal status
Within the framework of administrative divisions, Bavly serves as the administrative center of Bavlinsky District, even though it is not a part of it. As an administrative division, it is incorporated separately as the town of republic significance of Bavly—an administrative unit with the status equal to that of the districts. As a municipal division, the town of republic significance of Bavly is incorporated within Bavlinsky Municipal District as Bavly Urban Settlement.

Sister city
 Kütahya, Turkey

References

Notes

Sources

External links
Official website of Bavly 
Directory of organizations in Bavly 

Cities and towns in Tatarstan
Bugulminsky Uyezd